The 2019 British Rowing Junior Championships were the 48th edition of the National Junior Championships, held from 19–21 July 2019 at the National Water Sports Centre in Holme Pierrepont, Nottingham. They are organised and sanctioned by British Rowing, and are open to British junior rowers.

Winners

References

British Rowing Junior Championships
British Rowing Junior Championships
British Rowing Junior Championships